Like a Country Song is a 2014 Christian drama film starring Billy Ray Cyrus and Jennifer Taylor. The film released on September 9, 2014, by CMD Distribution. The film also stars Kerry Knuppe, Joel Smallbone.

Cast
 Billy Ray Cyrus as Bo Reeson
 Joel Smallbone as Jake Reeson
 Jennifer Taylor as Mia Reeson
 Kerry Knuppe as Becca
 Booboo Stewart as Bobby
 Larry Gatlin as Buck
 Gregory Alan Williams as Reggie
  Fivel Stewart as Nikki
  Madelyn Deutch as Zoey

Reception
ChristianReview.com rated the film at 4 out of 5 stars stating: "Like A County Song is a great movie.  It looks good thanks to some good lighting, camerawork, and post production color correcting, making this a movie that would play well on both at the theater and on a TV screen." The Dove Foundation said "This movie clearly illustrates the realities of life but also the hope one has in following God." Christian Cinema also gave the film 4 stars out of 5 stating "Make no mistake, this is a story about healing, forgiveness and redemption..." Ted Baehr of Movieguide rated the film with three stars out of four saying "Like A Country Song has many positive, faith affirming moments. It shows the freedom that forgiveness gives, not just in forgiving others of their mistakes, but accepting Christ’s forgiveness of our mistakes. A beautiful portrayal of the Gospel, repentance and reconciliation are properly displayed. Light caution is still advised for Like A Country Song, due to some minor violence and heavy drinking."

References

External links
 

2014 films
2014 independent films
American drama films
American independent films
Films about Christianity
Films about evangelicalism
Films about religion
2014 drama films
2010s English-language films
2010s American films